= Mai Sinai Wagle =

Mai Sinai Wagle was a 15th-century administrator and governor (subhedar) of the Goa region under the Vijayanagara Empire.

== Administration ==
Mai Sinai Wagle served as the chief minister (murvel pradhan) or governor (subhedar) of the Goa region under Vijayanagara rule between 1403 and 1404 AD. He is believed to have belonged to the lineage of Vasant Madhav.

His administrative activities are recorded in local stone inscriptions:

- 1402 (Velus Inscription): Recorded as an agent (munyari) of Narasa Gosavi. During Narasa Gosavi's tenure as Mahapradhan of Goa, Chandragutti, and Konkan (1401–1402), Mai Sinai managed the administration of the Goa region.
- 1413 (Bandora Inscription): Recorded as a representative of Nanjanna Gosavi. When Nanjanna Gosavi served as chief minister over Goa, Chandragutti, and Konkan, Mai Sinai oversaw the local governance of Goa under his authority.

== Personal life and patronage ==
According to the Konkanakhyana, his father was Purso Sinai, and his surname was written as Waghala (or Waglo). He was a resident of Cuncolim village near Mangeshi and was related to the Bokadbagkar Deshmukh of Bandora.

Mai Sinai was a benefactor of local temples:

- Established fixed annual grants (varsavil) for the Nagesh and Mahalakshmi temples.
- Donated agricultural land and spice plantations (kulagar) to support ritual food offerings (naivedya) at both temples.
